"Koro Sensations" is a single by Hey! Say! JUMP. It was released on March 15, 2015. It was released as a DVD single under the name Sensations for Ryosuke Yamada's movie, Assassination Classroom. The members each have a code name for the new unit. The group made two music videos for the single: Battle Mode and Operation Mode.

Regular Edition
DVD
 "Koro Sensations" PV Battle Mode
 "Koro Sensations" PV Operation mode
 "Koro Sensations" Making of PV Passive Side

Limited Edition
CD
 "Koro Sensations"
 "Koro Sensations" (Original Karaoke)

DVD
 "Koro Sensations" PV Battle Mode
 "Koro Sensations" Making of PV Active Side

References

2015 singles
2015 songs
Hey! Say! JUMP songs
J Storm singles